Ego or EGO may refer to:

Social sciences
 Ego (Freudian), one of the three constructs in Sigmund Freud's structural model of the psyche
 Egoism, an ethical theory that treats self-interest as the foundation of morality
 Egotism, the drive to maintain and enhance favorable views of oneself
 Egocentrism, the inability to differentiate between self and other
 Self-concept, a collection of beliefs about oneself that embodies the answer to "Who am I?"

Arts and media

Music
 Egó, an Icelandic band
 Ego (Oomph! album), 2001
 Ego (Tony Williams Lifetime album), 1971
 E.G.O. (album), a 2018 album by Lucie Silvas
 "Ego" (Big Bang song), 2012
 "Ego" (Beyoncé song), 2009
"Ego" (Ella Eyre song), 2017
 "Ego" (Elton John song), 1978
 "Ego" (Kim Wilde song), 1982
 "Ego" (Lali Espósito song), 2016
 "Ego" (The Saturdays song), 2010
 "Ego" (Spunge song), 2000
 "Ego" (Willy William song), 2015
 "Outro: Ego", a 2020 song by BTS
 EGO, a record label founded by Joe Haider

Other uses in arts and media
 Ego (2013 film), an Indian (Tamil) film
 Ego (2018 film), a Telugu language film
 Ego (2021 film), a Spanish film
 Ego (game engine), a video game engine developed by Codemasters
 Ego (magazine), a defunct online magazine for Indian Americans
 Ego (TV channel), an Israeli digital cable television channel
 Ego the Living Planet, a character in the Marvel Comics universe
 European History Online, an academic website

People
 Ego Lemos (born 1972), East Timorese musician
 Ego Leonard, Dutch visual artist
 Ego Nwodim (born 1988), American actress and comedian
 Ego Plum (born 1975), American film composer
 Paul Ego (born 1966), New Zealand comedian
 Prosper Ego (1927–2015), Dutch political activist
 Yuna Ego (born 2000), Japanese idol and member of music group SKE48

Science and technology
 Ego (fish), a genus of gobiid fishes
 Ego (game engine), a video game engine developed by Codemasters
 EGO sensor, an oxygen sensor in gasoline engines
 EGOT (gene), previously known as EGO
 European Gravitational Observatory, or EGO

Other uses
 Belgorod International Airport, in Russia
 Energica Ego, a motorcycle
 Planet Eclipse Ego, a paintball marker